USA Table Tennis, colloquially known as USATT, is the non-profit governing body for table tennis in the United States and is responsible for cataloging and sanctioning table tennis tournaments within the country. It was founded in 1933 as the United States Table Tennis Association. In addition to processing tournaments, USATT maintains a national rating and ranking system. It also oversees the USA National Teams. In total, USATT has over 9,000 members. The headquarters of USA Table Tennis is located in Colorado Springs, Colorado, United States, which is also home to the United States Olympic Training Center. USA Table Tennis offers a $100,000 incentive for American Olympic table tennis athletes,  though no American athlete has ever won a medal for table tennis.

History
The United States Table Tennis Association was created in 1933. The phrase "Table Tennis" was created because the name "Ping Pong" had already been trademarked by Parker Brothers. Though the legal name of the USATT remains the "United States Table Tennis Association, Inc.", the non-profit corporation adopted "USA Table Tennis" as their d/b/a name effective 1994.

Members
Although about 19 million Americans play for recreation, USATT has only about 9,000 members, as of December 2017. There are two main membership types, associate and general. General members can participate in USATT sanctioned events and leagues with no additional rating fees while associate members have no membership fee but may not participate in USATT sanctioned leagues and can pay per USATT sanctioned event. The pricing for a year for adults is $75 while for juniors and collegians is $45. There are over 300 table tennis clubs affiliated with USATT, almost 50 of which are in California. There are almost 450 USATT Certified Coaches in the United States.

Major sanctioned tournaments

U.S. Open

Started in 1931, the annual U.S. Open is the oldest table tennis event in the United States. It attracts over 600 athletes annually.  The U.S. Open has been previously held in various locations, including Anaheim, California; Charlotte, North Carolina; ; Las Vegas, Nevada and Fort Lauderdale, Florida. Past Menʼs Singles champions include Chen Weixing and Aleksandar Karakašević. Past Womenʼs Singles champions include Zhang Mo and Li Jiawei.

The Men's Singles champion was Sharath Kamal of India and the Women's Singles champion was Georgina Pota of Hungary.

The 2011 U.S. Open was held in Milwaukee, Wisconsin. The Men's Singles champion was Thomas Keinath of Slovakia. The Women's Singles Champion was Nai Hui Liu of New Jersey.

The 2017 U.S Open will be held in Las Vegas, Nevada from December 17.

U.S. Nationals
The U.S. Nationals have been held since 1976. The tournament is closed to non-citizens of the United States. In addition, the U.S. Nationals along with two other national ranking tournaments determine the members selected USA Table Tennis Adult, Cadet, and Junior Teams. Past Men's Singles champions include Kanak Jha, Eric Owens and David Zhuang and past Women's Singles champions include Lily Zhang, Jasna Reed and Wang Chen.

National Teams

As of 2021 World Championships

Coaches

Players

Current sponsorships
Butterfly
Nittaku Paddle Place
 Stag

See also
Glossary of table tennis
International Table Tennis Federation
List of USA Table Tennis champions
Table tennis at the Summer Olympics
United States Olympic Committee

References

External links

Evolution of Table Tennis in the US
Pool Cues Updated List

National members of the North American Table Tennis Union
Table Tennis
American table tennis organizations
501(c)(3) organizations
Non-profit organizations based in Colorado
Sports organizations established in 1933